The following outline is provided as an overview of and topical guide to Cape Verde:

Cape Verde – sovereign country located on an archipelago in the Macaronesia ecoregion of the North Atlantic Ocean, off the western coast of Africa.  The previously uninhabited islands were discovered and colonized by the Portuguese in the 15th century (though there may have been earlier discoveries), and attained independence in 1975.

General reference

 Pronunciation: 
 Common English country name: Cape Verde
 Official English country name: The Republic of Cape Verde
 Common endonym(s):
 Official endonym(s):
 Adjectival(s): Cape Verdean
 Demonym(s): Cape Verdeans
 Etymology: Name of Cape Verde
 ISO country codes: CV, CPV, 132
 ISO region codes: See ISO 3166-2:CV
 Internet country code top-level domain: .cv

Geography of Cape Verde 

Geography of Cape Verde
 Cape Verde is:
 an island country 
 of 10 islands and 8 islets
 a Developing country
 a Sovereign state
 Population of Cape Verde: 436,821(2008) - 165th most populous country
 Area of Cape Verde:  - 172nd largest country
 Atlas of Cape Verde

Location 
 Cape Verde is situated within:
 Northern Hemisphere and Western Hemisphere
 Atlantic Ocean
 Macaronesia
 Africa
 West Africa
 Time zone:  Cape Verde Time (UTC-01)
 Extreme points of Cape Verde
 High:  Mount Fogo 
 Low:  North Atlantic Ocean 0 m
 Land boundaries:  none
 Coastline:  965 km

Environment of Cape Verde 

 Climate of Cape Verde
 Cape Verde-type hurricane
 Geology of Cape Verde
 Wildlife of Cape Verde
 Fauna of Cape Verde
 Birds of Cape Verde
 Mammals of Cape Verde

Natural geographic features of Cape Verde 

 Glaciers in Cape Verde: none 
 Islands of Cape Verde
 Mountains of Cape Verde
 Volcanoes in Cape Verde
 World Heritage Sites in Cape Verde: Cidade Velha

Regions of Cape Verde 

Regions of Cape Verde

Administrative divisions of Cape Verde 

Administrative divisions of Cape Verde
 Municipalities of Cape Verde

Municipalities of Cape Verde 

Municipalities of Cape Verde
 Capital of Cape Verde: Praia
 Cities of Cape Verde

Demography of Cape Verde 

Demographics of Cape Verde

Government and politics of Cape Verde 

Politics of Cape Verde
 Form of government: unitary semi-presidential representative democratic republic
 Capital of Cape Verde: Praia
 Elections in Cape Verde
 Political parties in Cape Verde

Branches of government

Government of Cape Verde

Executive branch of the government of Cape Verde 
 Head of state: President of Cape Verde, Jorge Carlos Fonseca
 Head of government: Prime Minister of Cape Verde, Ulisses Correia e Silva
 Cabinet of Cape Verde

Legislative branch of the government of Cape Verde 

 Parliament of Cape Verde: National Assembly (unicameral)

Judicial branch of the government of Cape Verde

Foreign relations of Cape Verde 

Foreign relations of Cape Verde
 Diplomatic missions in Cape Verde
 Diplomatic missions of Cape Verde

International organization membership 
Cape Verde is a member of:

African Development Bank Group (AfDB)
African Union (AU)
African, Caribbean, and Pacific Group of States (ACP)
 Community of Democracies (CD)
Comunidade dos Países de Língua Portuguesa (CPLP)
Economic Community of West African States (ECOWAS)
Food and Agriculture Organization (FAO)
Group of 77 (G77)
International Bank for Reconstruction and Development (IBRD)
International Civil Aviation Organization (ICAO)
International Criminal Court (ICCt)
International Criminal Police Organization (Interpol)
International Development Association (IDA)
International Federation of Red Cross and Red Crescent Societies (IFRCS)
International Finance Corporation (IFC)
International Fund for Agricultural Development (IFAD)
International Labour Organization (ILO)
International Maritime Organization (IMO)
International Monetary Fund (IMF)
International Olympic Committee (IOC)
International Organization for Migration (IOM)
International Red Cross and Red Crescent Movement (ICRM)
International Telecommunication Union (ITU)
International Telecommunications Satellite Organization (ITSO)
International Trade Union Confederation (ITUC)
Inter-Parliamentary Union (IPU)
Multilateral Investment Guarantee Agency (MIGA)
Nonaligned Movement (NAM)
Organisation internationale de la Francophonie (OIF)
Organisation for the Prohibition of Chemical Weapons (OPCW)
União Latina
United Nations (UN)
United Nations Conference on Trade and Development (UNCTAD)
United Nations Educational, Scientific, and Cultural Organization (UNESCO)
United Nations Industrial Development Organization (UNIDO)
Universal Postal Union (UPU)
World Customs Organization (WCO)
World Federation of Trade Unions (WFTU)
World Health Organization (WHO)
World Intellectual Property Organization (WIPO)
World Meteorological Organization (WMO)
World Tourism Organization (UNWTO)
World Trade Organization (WTO)

Law and order in Cape Verde 

 Capital punishment in Cape Verde
 Crime in Cape Verde
 Human rights in Cape Verde
 LGBT rights in Cape Verde
 Freedom of religion in Cape Verde
 Law enforcement in Cape Verde

Military of Cape Verde 

Military of Cape Verde
 Command
 Commander-in-chief of Cape Verde: the President of Cape Verde, Pedro Pires
 Forces
 Army of Cape Verde
 Navy of Cape Verde
 Military history of Cape Verde

History of Cape Verde 

History of Cape Verde
 Military history of Cape Verde

Culture of Cape Verde 

Culture of Cape Verde
 Architecture of Cape Verde
 Languages of Cape Verde
 National symbols of Cape Verde
 Coat of arms of Cape Verde
 Flag of Cape Verde
 National anthem of Cape Verde
 People of Cape Verde
 Public holidays in Cape Verde
 Religion in Cape Verde
 Buddhism in Cape Verde
 Christianity in Cape Verde
 Roman Catholicism in Cape Verde
 Hinduism in Cape Verde
 Islam in Cape Verde
 World Heritage Sites in Cape Verde: Cidade Velha

Art in Cape Verde 
 Music of Cape Verde

Sports in Cape Verde 

 Football in Cape Verde
 Cape Verde at the Olympics

Economy and infrastructure of Cape Verde 

Economy of Cape Verde
 Economic rank, by nominal GDP (2007): 160th (one hundred and sixtieth)
 Agriculture in Cape Verde
 Communications in Cape Verde
 Internet in Cape Verde
 Companies of Cape Verde
 Currency of Cape Verde: Escudo
ISO 4217: CVE
 Energy in Cape Verde
 Health care in Cape Verde
 Mining in Cape Verde
 Tourism in Cape Verde
 Visa policy of Cape Verde
 Transport in Cape Verde
 Airports in Cape Verde
 Roads in Cape Verde

Education in Cape Verde 

Education in Cape Verde

Health in Cape Verde 

Health in Cape Verde

See also 

Cape Verde

Index of Cape Verde–related articles
List of Cape Verde-related topics
List of international rankings
Member state of the United Nations
Outline of Africa

References

External links

Government of Cape Verde 
National Assembly of Cape Verde 

Cape Verde. The World Factbook. Central Intelligence Agency.
Cape Verde - BBC Country Profile 

Cape Verde
Cape Verde